The Lechkhumi uezd was a county (uezd) of the Kutaisi Governorate of the Caucasus Viceroyalty of the Russian Empire. It bordered the Terek and Kuban oblasts to the north, the Sukhumi Okrug to the west, the Zugdidi, Senaki, and Kutais uezds to the south and the Racha uezd to the east. The area of the uezd corresponded to most of the contemporary Samegrelo-Zemo Svaneti region of Georgia. The administrative center of the Lechkhumi uezd was the town of Tsageri.

History 
The Lechkhumi uezd was formed in 1867 as part of the Kutaisi Governorate on the territory during the time of the Russian Empire. In 1918, the Kutaisi Governorate including the Lechkhumi uezd was incorporated into the Democratic Republic of Georgia.

Administrative divisions 
The subcounties (uchastoks) of the Lechkhumi uezd in 1913 were as follows:

Demographics

Russian Empire Census 
The majority of the population indicated Imeretian to be their mother tongue, with a significant Svan speaking minority.

Kavkazskiy kalendar 

Notes

References

Bibliography 

Uezds of Kutaisi Governorate